"Seal Our Fate" is a song by Cuban-American singer and songwriter Gloria Estefan, taken from her second solo album, Into the Light (1991). The song was written by Estefan, and produced by her husband Emilio Estefan, Jr., Clay Ostwald, and Jorge Casas. It was released as the album's second single by Epic Records on March 18, 1991 in the UK and on April 16, 1991 worldwide. The 7-inch vinyl single in the UK was released as a "Limited Edition Tour Souvenir Pack" and the Latin American promo-single was released with the name of "Sella Nuestro Destino" that means the same in English, but the song was not in a Spanish version. Some remixes were made for the song, some of which were produced by John Hagg and Eric Schilling.

Critical reception
Matthew Hocter from Albumism chose "Seal Our Fate" as one of three singles, that "truly stand out" of the album. Larry Flick from Billboard described it as an "upbeat, philosophical pop/rocker", noting further that Estefan "works up a respectable sweat amid an aggressive, guitar-driven arrangement." The Daily Vault's Mark Millan called it a "so-so pop-rocker" and picked the song as one of three "real hits" of the album, with "Live for Loving You" and "Coming Out of the Dark". Mario Tarradell from Knight Ridder said the song is "a product of the accident", adding that Estefan "delivers her message — prepare for tomorrow because you never know what will happen next — with strong lyrics and a hard rock beat." A reviewer from People Magazine described it as "slightly funky".

Music video

A music video for the song was released, and is one of Gloria's most choreographed ever videos, similar to the choreography made by Paula Abdul on her music-video "Cold Hearted." It became a hit since fans and followers of Estefan saw her recovered from her near-fatal accident. In the video she dances and follows a choreography for the song with the other dancers.

Pepsi commercial
The song which was a moderate-hit was used for a 1991 Pepsi commercial that featured Estefan. The clip shows a student listening to (presumably) his teacher (Estefan), but then he drinks a Pepsi soda and turns on his walkman, which leads to his teacher turning into a rock star singing this song and the scenario being changed from the school to a concert stage where the singer is dancing and singing. The student then realizes he is only dreaming and pays attention back to the teacher, who at the end shuts an eye to the camera and the commercial ends with a Pepsi slogan.

Charts

Track listings

Release history

Official versions
Original versions
 Album version  — 4:25
 Edit  — 3:55

Remixes
 Extended Remix  — 6:09
 Remix Edit  — 4:13
 Dub  — 5:33

References

External links

1991 songs
1991 singles
Dance-rock songs
Epic Records singles
Gloria Estefan songs
Songs written by Gloria Estefan